The Saurashtra women's cricket team is an Indian domestic cricket team based in Saurashtra. The team has represented the state in Women's Senior One Day Trophy (List A) and  Senior women's T20 league.

References

Women's cricket teams in India
Cricket in Gujarat